Tmesisternus agriloides is a species of beetle in the family Cerambycidae. It was described by Francis Polkinghorne Pascoe in 1867.

Subspecies
 Tmesisternus agriloides persimilis Breuning, 1968
 Tmesisternus agriloides agriloides Pascoe, 1867

References

agriloides
Beetles described in 1867